This is a list of the Japanese species of the superfamilies Micropterigoidea, Nepticuloidea, Adeloidea, Tischerioidea, Tineoidea, Gracillarioidea and Yponomeutoidea. It also acts as an index to the species articles and forms part of the full List of moths of Japan.

Micropterigidae
 モンフタオビコバネ — Micropterix aureatella (Scopoli, 1763)
 ムモンコバネ — Paramartyria immaculatella Issiki, 1931
 マエモンコバネ — Paramartyria semifasciella Issiki, 1931
 和名未定 — Issikiomartyria akemiae Hashimoto, 2006
 和名未定 — Issikiomartyria bisegmentata Hashimoto, 2006
 和名未定 — Issikiomartyria distincta Hashimoto, 2006
 シロウマヒロコバネ — Issikiomartyria nudata (Issiki, 1953)
 和名未定 — Issikiomartyria plicata Hashimoto, 2006
 和名未定 — Kurokopteryx dolichocerata Hashimoto, 2006
 サンダンキョウヒロコバネ — Neomicropteryx bifurca Issiki, 1953
 イシヅチヒロコバネ — Neomicropteryx cornuta Issiki, 1953
 ツルギヒロコバネ — Neomicropteryx elongata Issiki, 1953
 カズサヒロコバネ — Neomicropteryx kazusana Hashimoto, 1992
 和名未定 — Neomicropteryx kiwana Hashimoto, 2006
 マツムラヒロコバネ — Neomicropteryx matsumurana Issiki, 1931
 ニッポンヒロコバネ — Neomicropteryx nipponensis Issiki, 1931
 和名未定 — Neomicropteryx redacta Hashimoto, 2006

Eriocraniidae
 ムラサキマダラスイコバネ  — Eriocrania komaii Mizukawa, Hirowatari & Hashimoto, 2006
 ハンノキスイコバネ  — Eriocrania sakhalinella Kozlov, 1983
 オオスイコバネ  — Eriocrania semipurpurella semipurpurella (Stephens, 1835)
 キンマダラスイコバネ  — Eriocrania sparrmannella (Bosc, 1791)
 イッシキスイコバネ  — Issikiocrania japonicella Moriuti, 1982

Hepialidae
 チシマシロスジコウモリ  — Gazoryctra chishimana (Matsumura, 1931)
 オオギンスジコウモリ  — Gazoryctra macilentus spinifera Tshistjakov, 1997
 シロテンコウモリ  — Palpifer sexnotatus niphonicus (Butler, 1879)
 キタコウモリ  — Pharmacis fusconebulosa askoldensis (Staudinger, 1887)
 ウスイロコウモリ  — Thitarodes nipponensis Ueda, 1996
 ヒメコウモリ  — Thitarodes variabilis (Bremer, 1861)
 キンスジコウモリ  — Phymatopus japonicus Inoue, 1982
 コウモリガ  — Endoclita excrescens (Butler, 1877)
 キマダラコウモリ  — Endoclita sinensis (Moore, 1877)

Nepticulidae
 オオイシチビガ  — Trifurcula oishiella Matsumura, 1931
 和名未定  — Stigmella acrochaetia Kemperman & Wilkinson, 1985
 クヌギクロモグリチビガ  — Stigmella aladina Puplesis, 1984
 和名未定  — Stigmella alaurulenta Kemperman & Wilkinson, 1985
 イチゴモグリチビガ  — Stigmella alikurokoi Kemperman & Wilkinson, 1985
 シラカバモグリチビガ  — Stigmella betulicola (Stainton, 1856)
 コアカソモグリチビガ  — Stigmella boehmeriae Kemperman & Wilkinson, 1985
 アカガシモグリチビガ  — Stigmella caesurifasciella Kemperman & Wilkinson, 1985
 シイモグリチビガ  — Stigmella castanopsiella (Kuroko, 1978)
 イヌシデモグリチビガ  — Stigmella cathepostis Kemperman & Wilkinson, 1985
 クサボケモグリチビガ  — Stigmella chaenomelae Kemperman & Wilkinson, 1985
 クヌギギンモグリチビガ  — Stigmella chrysopterella Kemperman & Wilkinson, 1985
 和名未定  — Stigmella clisiotophora Kemperman & Wilkinson, 1985
 ハンノモグリチビガ  — Stigmella conchyliata Kemperman & Wilkinson, 1985
 カシワモグリチビガ  — Stigmella dentatae Puplesis, 1984
 エゴノモグリチビガ  — Stigmella egonokii Kemperman & Wilkinson, 1985
 ズグロモグリチビガ  — Stigmella fumida Kemperman & Wilkinson, 1985
 ギンモンモグリチビガ  — Stigmella gimmonella (Matsumura, 1931)
 キオビシイモグリチビガ  — Stigmella hisaii Kuroko, 2004
 リンゴクロモグリチビガ  — Stigmella honshui Kemperman & Wilkinson, 1985
 イチゴアカガネモグリチビガ  — Stigmella ichigoiella Kemperman & Wilkinson, 1985
 クナシリモグリチビガ  — Stigmella kurilensis Puplesis, 1987
 クヌギモグリチビガ  — Stigmella kurokoi Puplesis, 1984
 クロツバラモグリチビガ  — Stigmella kurotsubarai Kemperman & Wilkinson, 1985
 和名未定  — Stigmella nakamurai Kemperman & Wilkinson, 1985
 和名未定  — Stigmella nireae Kemperman & Wilkinson, 1985
 ギンスジモグリチビガ  — Stigmella oa Kemperman & Wilkinson, 1985
 和名未定  — Stigmella omelkoi Puplesis, 1984
 チヂミザサモグリチビガ  — Stigmella oplismeniella Kemperman & Wilkinson, 1985
 ヤクシマモグリチビガ  — Stigmella orientalis Kemperman & Wilkinson, 1985
 和名未定  — Stigmella populnea Kemperman & Wilkinson, 1985
 和名未定  — Stigmella sesplicata Kemperman & Wilkinson, 1985
 ウラジロノキモグリチビガ  — Stigmella sorbivora Kemperman & Wilkinson, 1985
 イチゴギンモグリチビガ  — Stigmella spiculifera Kemperman & Wilkinson, 1985
 和名未定  — Stigmella titivillitia Kemperman & Wilkinson, 1985
 和名未定  — Stigmella tranocrossa Kemperman & Wilkinson, 1985
 シスジチビガ  — Stigmella trifasciata (Matsumura, 1931)
 イタヤモグリチビガ  — Stigmella ultima Puplesis, 1984
 ヤナギモグリチビガ  — Stigmella vittata Kemperman & Wilkinson, 1985
 ケヤキモグリチビガ  — Stigmella zelkoviella Kemperman & Wilkinson, 1985
 ズミモグリチビガ  — Stigmella zumii Kemperman & Wilkinson, 1985
 和名未定  — Bohemannia manschurella Puplesis, 1984
 和名未定  — Bohemannia nubila Puplesis, 1985
 和名未定  — Ectoedemia admiranda Puplesis, 1984
 和名未定  — Ectoedemia amani Svensson, 1966
 ハイイロモグリチビガ  — Ectoedemia arisi Puplesis, 1984
 オトギリモグリチビガ  — Ectoedemia hypericifolia (Kuroko, 1982)
 和名未定  — Ectoedemia occultiella (Linnaeus, 1767)
 和名未定  — Ectoedemia olivina Puplesis, 1984
 和名未定  — Ectoedemia pilosae Puplesis, 1984
 和名未定  — Ectoedemia scoblei Puplesis, 1984
 コケモモチビモグリガ  — Ectoedemia weaveri (Stainton, 1855)
 Ectoedemia cerviparadisicola Sato, 2012
 フタテンオビモグリチビガ  — Etainia capesella (Puplesis, 1985)
 キイロモグリチビガ  — Etainia peterseni Puplesis, 1985
 トラフモグリチビガ  — Etainia tigrinella (Puplesis, 1985)

Opostegidae
 シロヒラタモグリガ  — Opostegoides albellus Sinev, 1990
 ミノドヒラタモグリガ  — Opostegoides minodensis (Kuroko, 1982)
 ツマキヒラタモグリガ  — Opostegoides omelkoi Kozlov, 1985
 和名未定  — Eosopostega issikii Davis, 1989
 ヒメヒラタモグリガ  — Pseudopostega auritella (Hübner, [1813])
 ツマスジヒラタモグリガ  — Pseudopostega crepusculella (Zeller, 1839)

Heliozelidae
 ムラサキツヤコガ  — Tyriozela porphyrogona Meyrick, 1931
 ミヤマツヤコガ  — Heliozela angulata Lee, Hirowatari & Kuroko, 2006
 ウストビツヤコガ  — Heliozela biprominens Lee, Hirowatari & Kuroko, 2006
 トビイロツヤコガ  — Heliozela brevitalea Lee, Hirowatari & Kuroko, 2006
 クリチビツヤコガ  — Heliozela castaneella Kuroko, 1982
 カツラギツヤコガ  — Heliozela glabrata Lee, Hirowatari & Kuroko, 2006
 アシオビツヤコガ  — Heliozela limbata Lee, Hirowatari & Kuroko, 2006
 ツヤコガ  — Heliozela subpurpurea Meyrick, 1934
 ブドウツヤコガ  — Antispila ampelopsia Kuroko, 1961
 サカキツヤコガ  — Antispila cleyerella Lee, 2006
 ミズキツヤコガ  — Antispila corniella Kuroko, 1961
 和名未定  — Antispila distyliella Lee, Hirowatari & Kuroko, 2006
 キンモンツヤコガ  — Antispila hikosana Kuroko, 1961
 アジサイツヤコガ  — Antispila hydrangifoliella Kuroko, 1961
 オオブドウキンモンツヤコガ  — Antispila inouei Kuroko, 1987
 和名未定  — Antispila iviella Kuroko, 1961
 チビブドウツヤコガ  — Antispila orbiculella Kuroko, 1961
 ムラサキミズキツヤコガ  — Antispila purplella Kuroko, 1961
 和名未定  — Antispila tateshinensis Kuroko, 1987
 ブドウキンモンツヤコガ  — Antispila uenoi Kuroko, 1987

Adelidae
 ムモンケブカヒゲナガ  — Adela luminaris Hirowatari, 1997
 アトキケブカヒゲナガ  — Adela luteocilis Hirowatari, 1997
 ケブカヒゲナガ  — Adela praepilosa Hirowatari, 1997
 ミドリヒゲナガ  — Adela reaumurella (Linnaeus, 1758)
 コンオビヒゲナガ  — Nemophora ahenea Stringer, 1930
 クロハネシロヒゲナガ  — Nemophora albiantennella Issiki, 1930
 オオヒゲナガ  — Nemophora amatella (Staudinger, 1892)
 ギンヒゲナガ  — Nemophora askoldella (Millière, 1879)
 ホソオビヒゲナガ  — Nemophora aurifera (Butler, 1881)
 キオビコヒゲナガ  — Nemophora bifasciatella Issiki, 1930
 ヤマキヒゲナガ  — Nemophora japonica Stringer, 1930
 カラフトヒゲナガ北海道亜種  — Nemophora karafutonis karafutonis (Matsumura, 1932)
 カラフトヒゲナガ本州以南亜種  — Nemophora karafutonis moriokensis (Okano, 1957)
 和名未定  — Nemophora lapikella Kozlov, 1997
 イナズマヒゲナガ  — Nemophora magnifica Kozlov, 1997
 アマミヒゲナガ  — Nemophora marisella Kozlov & Hirowatari, 1997
 ツマモンヒゲナガ  — Nemophora ochsenheimerella (Hübner, [1813])
 ギンスジヒゲナガ  — Nemophora optima (Butler, 1878)
 ヒロオビヒゲナガ  — Nemophora paradisea (Butler, 1881)
 タイワンオオヒゲナガ  — Nemophora polychorda (Meyrick, 1914)
 リュウキュウクロヒゲナガ  — Nemophora pruinosa Hirowatari, 2005
 ゴマフヒゲナガ  — Nemophora raddei (Rebel, 1901)
 ベニオビヒゲナガ  — Nemophora rubrofascia (Christoph, 1882)
 アキヨシヒゲナガ  — Nemophora smaragdaspis (Meyrick, 1924)
 ウスベニヒゲナガ  — Nemophora staudingerella (Christoph, 1881)
 ギンスジコヒゲナガ  — Nemophora stellata Hirowatari, 1995
 ミヤマコヒゲナガ  — Nemophora sylvatica Hirowatari, 1995
 和名未定  — Nemophora takamukuella (Matsumura, 1932)
 ウスオビコヒゲナガ  — Nemophora tenuifasciata Hirowatari, 2005
 ホソフタオビヒゲナガ  — Nemophora trimetrella Stringer, 1930
 キオビクロヒゲナガ  — Nemophora umbripennis Stringer, 1930
 ワカヤマヒゲナガ  — Nemophora wakayamensis (Matsumura, 1931)
 ウスキヒゲナガ  — Nematopogon distinctus Yasuda, 1957
 アトボシウスキヒゲナガ  — Nematopogon dorsigutellus (Erschoff, 1877)
 ゴマフヒメウスキヒゲナガ  — Nematopogon robertellus (Clerck, 1759)

Prodoxidae
 アルタイマガリガ  — Lampronia altaica Zagulajev, 1992
 キマダラマガリガ  — Lampronia corticella (Linnaeus, 1758)
 フタオビマガリガ  — Lampronia flavimitrella (Hübner, [1817])
 ヘリモンマガリガ  — Greya marginimaculata (Issiki, 1957)
 アラスカマガリガ  — Greya variabilis Davis & Pellmyr, 1992

Incurvariidae
 ヒメフタオビマガリガ  — Phylloporia bistrigella (Haworth, 1828)
 ホソバネマガリガ  — Vespina nielseni Kozlov, 1987
 ウスキンモンマガリガ  — Procacitas orientella (Kozlov, 1987)
 フタモンマガリガ  — Alloclemensia maculata Nielsen, 1981
 ヒトスジマガリガ  — Alloclemensia unifasciata Nielsen, 1981
 タカネマガリガ  — Excurvaria praelatella ([Denis & Schiffermüller], 1775)
 ムラサキツヤマガリガ  — Paraclemensia caerulea (Issiki, 1957)
 ヒメアオマガリガ  — Paraclemensia cyanea Nielsen, 1982
 クロツヤマガリガ  — Paraclemensia incerta (Christoph, 1882)
 アズキナシマガリガ  — Paraclemensia monospina Nielsen, 1982
 クリヒメマガリガ  — Paraclemensia oligospina Nielsen, 1982
 イヌシデマガリガ  — Paraclemensia viridis Nielsen, 1982
 ハンノキマガリガ  — Incurvaria alniella (Issiki, 1957)
 クシヒゲマガリガ  — Incurvaria takeuchii Issiki, 1957
 コケモモマガリガ  — Incurvaria vetulella (Zetterstedt, 1839)

Tischeriidae
 ニセクヌギキハモグリガ  — Tischeria decidua Wocke, 1876
 和名未定  — Tischeria naraensis Sato, 1993
 クヌギキハモグリガ  — Tischeria quercifolia Kuroko, 1982
 バラクロハモグリガ  — Emmetia angusticollella (Duponchel, 1843)
 キイチゴクロハモグリガ  — Emmetia heinemanni (Wocke, 1871)
 ワレモコウツヤハモグリガ本州以南亜種  — Emmetia szoecsi japonica (Kuroko, 1982)
 ワレモコウツヤハモグリガ北海道亜種  — Emmetia szoecsi szoecsi (Kasy, 1961)
 和名未定  — Coptotriche japoniella Puplesis and Diskus, 2003

Tineidae
 クシヒゲキヒロズコガ  — Pelecystola strigosa (Moore, 1888)
 ナガバヒロズコガ  — Cephitinea colonella (Erschoff, 1874)
 マダラマルハヒロズコガ  — Gaphara conspersa (Matsumura, 1931)
 クロクモヒロズコガ  — Psecadioides aspersus Butler, 1881
 アトスカシモンヒロズコガ  — Gerontha borea Moriuti, 1977
 ハチノスヒロズコガ  — Cephimallota chasanica (Zagulajev, 1965)
 和名未定  — Liopycnas percnombra Meyrick, 1937
 和名未定  — Micrerethista denticulata Davis, 1998
 クロスジキヒロズコガ  — Tineovertex melanochryseus (Meyrick, 1911)
 コケヒロズコガ  — Eudarcia orbiculidomus (Sakai & Saigusa, 1999)
 オオヒロズコガ  — Scardia amurensis Zagulajev, 1965
 和名未定  — Amorophaga japonica Robinson, 1986
 アトモンヒロズコガ  — Morophaga bucephala (Snellen, 1884)
 和名未定  — Morophaga choragella ([Denis & Schiffermüller], 1775)
 ウスマダラオオヒロズコガ  — Morophaga fasciculata Robinson, 1986
 和名未定  — Morophaga formosana Robinson, 1986
 サカイヒロズコガ  — Morophaga iriomotensis Robinson, 1986
 シイタケオオヒロズコガ  — Morophagoides moriutii Robinson, 1986
 和名未定  — Montescardia kurenzovi (Zagulajev, 1966)
 マエモンヒロズコガ  — Dinica endochrysa (Meyrick, 1935)
 ウスグロコクガ  — Haplotinea insectella (Fabricius, 1794)
 和名未定  — Nemapogon gerasimovi Zagulajev, 1961
 コクガ  — Nemapogon granella (Linnaeus, 1758)
 シラホシミヤマヒロズコガ  — Triaxomera puncticulata Miyamoto, Hirowatari & Yamamoto, 2002
 ハイイロスカシモンヒロズコガ  — Crypsithyris cana Sakai & Saigusa, 2002
 クロモンチビヒロズコガ  — Crypsithyris crococoma Meyrick, 1934
 ウスグロスカシモンヒロズコガ  — Crypsithyris japonica Petersen & Gaedike, 1993
 コガタスカシモンヒロズコガ  — Crypsithyris saigusai Gaedike, 2000
 ジュウタンガ  — Trichophaga tapetzella (Linnaeus, 1758)
 ウスグロイガ  — Niditinea baryspilas (Meyrick, 1937)
 クロスジイガ  — Niditinea striolella (Matsumura, 1931)
 コイガ  — Tineola bisselliella (Hummel, 1823)
 トリノフンヒロズコガ  — Tinea columbariella Wocke, 1877
 和名未定  — Tinea protograpta Meyrick, 1935
 イガ  — Tinea translucens Meyrick, 1917
 和名未定  — Tinea trapezoides Meyrick, 1935
 アトキヒロズコガ  — Monopis flavidorsalis (Matsumura, 1931)
 マエモンクロヒロズコガ  — Monopis pavlovskii (Zagulajev, 1955)
 和名未定  — Ceratosticha leptodeta Meyrick, 1935
 デコボコヒロズコガ  — Dasyses barbata (Christoph, 1881)
 コブヒロズコガ  — Dasyses rugosella (Stainton, 1859)
 アトボシメンコガ  — Wegneria cerodelta (Meyrick, 1911)
 クロエリメンコガ  — Opogona nipponica Stringer, 1930
 クロテンオオメンコガ  — Opogona sacchari (Bojer, 1856)
 モトキメンコガ  — Opogona thiadelpha Meyrick, 1934
 ヒメツマオレガ  — Dryadaula epischista (Meyrick, 1936)
 クロスジツマオレガ  — Erechthias atririvis (Meyrick, 1931)
 チビツマオレガ  — Erechthias ioloxa (Meyrick, 1936)
 和名未定  — Erechthias itoi Moriuti & Kadohara, 1994
 ウスモンツマオレガ  — Erechthias sphenoschista (Meyrick, 1931)
 和名未定  — Erechthias zebrina (Butler, 1881)
 マダラシロツマオレガ  — Comodica contributa (Meyrick, 1932)
 和名未定  — Comodica saitoi Moriuti & Kadohara, 1994
 和名未定  — Pyloetis mimosae (Stainton, 1859)
 ウスバヒロズコガ  — Psychoides phaedrospora (Meyrick, 1935)

Galacticidae
 ネムスガ  — Homadaula anisocentra Meyrick, 1922

Psychidae
 和名未定  — Diplodoma herminata (Geoffroy, 1785)
 和名未定  — Trigonodoma japonica Sugimoto & Saigusa, 2004
 シロテンチビミノガ  — Paranarychia albomaculatella Saigusa, 1961
 和名未定  — Anatolopsyche stylifera Sugimoto & Saigusa, 2003
 ウスシロテンチビミノガ  — Siederia listerella (Linnaeus, 1758)
 和名未定  — Dahlica parthenogenesis (Saigusa, 1961)
 アマリチビミノガ  — Taleporia amariensis Saigusa, 1961
 クロチビミノガ  — Taleporia nigropterella Saigusa, 1961
 トガリチビミノガ  — Taleporia shosenkyoensis Saigusa, 1961
 ハイイロチビミノガ  — Taleporia trichopterella Saigusa, 1961
 ナツノチビミノガ  — Kozhantshikovia aestivalis Saigusa, 1961
 ハルノチビミノガ  — Kozhantshikovia vernalis Saigusa, 1961
 和名未定  — Eumasia muscella Saigusa & Sugimoto, 2005
 和名未定  — Eumasia viridilichenella Saigusa & Sugimoto, 2005
 アキノヒメミノガ  — Bacotia sakabei Seino, 1981
 ヒメミノガ  — Psyche niphonica (Hori, 1926)
 アシシロマルバネミノガ  — Manatha taiwana (Sonan, 1935)
 和名未定  — Eumeta kiushiuana (Yazaki, 1926)
 チャミノガ  — Eumeta minuscula Butler, 1881
 オオミノガ  — Eumeta variegata (Snellen, 1879)
 キタクロミノガ  — Canephora pungelerii (Heylaerts, 1900)
 オオキタクロミノガ  — Canephora unicolor (Hufnagel, 1766)
 シバミノガ  — Nipponopsyche fuscescens Yazaki, 1926
 コンドウシロミノガ  — Chalioides kondonis Kondo, 1922
 ネグロミノガ  — Acanthopsyche nigraplaga (Wileman, 1911)
 ニトベミノガ  — Mahasena aurea (Butler, 1881)
 トミナガクロミノガ  — Striglocyrbasia meguae Sugimoto & Saigusa, 2001

Amphitheridae
 アトキヒカリバコガ  — Roeslerstammia erxlebella bella Moriuti, 1982
 ムジヒカリバコガ  — Roeslerstammia pronubella nitidella Moriuti, 1972
 ヨツメナガヒゲガ  — Telethera blepharacma Meyrick, 1913
 ホルトノキナガヒゲガ  — Agriothera elaeocarpophaga Moriuti, 1978

Bucculatricidae
Bucculatrix altera Seksjaeva, 1989
Bucculatrix armata Seksjaeva, 1989
Bucculatrix cidarella (Zeller, 1839) 
 クロツバラチビガ  — Bucculatrix citima Seksjaeva, 1992
Bucculatrix comporabile Seksjaeva, 1989
Bucculatrix demaryella (Duponchel, 1840)
Bucculatrix exedra Meyrick, 1915
 アオギリチビガ  — Bucculatrix firmianella Kuroko, 1982
Bucculatrix hamaboella 	Kobayashi, Hirowatari & Kuroko, 2009
Bucculatrix kogii Kobayashi, Hirowatari & Kuroko, 2010
Bucculatrix laciniatella Benander, 1931
Bucculatrix maritima Stainton, 1851
Bucculatrix muraseae Kobayashi, Hirowatari & Kuroko, 2010
Bucculatrix notella Seksjaeva, 1996
Bucculatrix nota Seksjaeva, 1989
 ナシチビガ  — Bucculatrix pyrivorella Kuroko, 1964
Bucculatrix serratella Kobayashi, Hirowatari & Kuroko, 2010
Bucculatrix sinevi Seksjaeva, 1988
Bucculatrix splendida Seksjaeva, 1992
Bucculatrix thoracella  (Thunberg, 1794) 
Bucculatrix tsurubamella Kobayashi, Hirowatari & Kuroko, 2010
Bucculatrix univoca Meyrick, 1918

Gracillariidae 
 ハンノホシボシホソガ  — Parornix alni Kumata, 1965
 カバホシボシホソガ  — Parornix betulae (Stainton, 1854)
 和名未定  — Parornix minor Kumata, 1965
 ホシボシホソガ  — Parornix multimaculata (Matsumura, 1931)
 ベニホソガ  — Macarostola japonica Kumata, 1977
 シロハマキホソガ  — Gracillaria albicapitata Issiki, 1930
 和名未定  — Gracillaria arsenievi (Ermolaev, 1977)
 イボタホソガ  — Gracillaria japonica Kumata, 1982
 和名未定  — Gracillaria ussuriella (Ermolaev, 1977)
 モミジハマキホソガ  — Caloptilia acericola Kumata, 1966
 イタヤハマキホソガ  — Caloptilia aceris Kumata, 1966
 ハンノハマキホソガ  — Caloptilia alni Kumata, 1966
 ヤマモガシハマキホソガ  — Caloptilia ariana (Meyrick, 1914)
 和名未定  — Caloptilia aurifasciata Kumata, 1982
 ツツジハマキホソガ  — Caloptilia azaleella (Brants, 1913)
 カンバハマキホソガ  — Caloptilia betulicola (Hering, 1928)
 和名未定  — Caloptilia bipunctata Kumata, 1982
 和名未定  — Caloptilia callicarpae Kumata, 1982
 クスノハマキホソガ  — Caloptilia camphorae Kumata, 1982
 タマホソガ  — Caloptilia cecidophora Kumata, 1966
 エノキハマキホソガ  — Caloptilia celtidis Kumata, 1982
 ヤナギコハマキホソガ  — Caloptilia chrysolampra (Meyrick, 1938)
 和名未定  — Caloptilia crinotibialis Kumata, 1982
 和名未定  — Caloptilia cuculipennella (Hübner, [1796])
 フタモンハマキホソガ  — Caloptilia geminata Kumata, 1966
 ムラサキハマキホソガ  — Caloptilia gloriosa Kumata, 1966
 ヘリングハマキホソガ  — Caloptilia heringi Kumata, 1966
 ヒダカハマキホソガ  — Caloptilia hidakensis Kumata, 1966
 シキミハマキホソガ  — Caloptilia illicii Kumata, 1966
 コガネハマキホソガ  — Caloptilia isochrysa (Meyrick, 1908)
 ハンノナガホソガ  — Caloptilia issikii Kumata, 1982
 カズラハマキホソガ  — Caloptilia kadsurae Kumata, 1966
 和名未定  — Caloptilia kisoensis Kumata, 1982
 クロコハマキホソガ  — Caloptilia kurokoi Kumata, 1966
 ハナヒリノキハマキホソガ  — Caloptilia leucothoes Kumata, 1982
 キバナイカリソウハマキホソガ  — Caloptilia magnifica moriokensis Kumata, 1982
 コブシハマキホソガ  — Caloptilia magnoliae Kumata, 1966
 ミズナラハマキホソガ  — Caloptilia mandchurica (Christoph, 1882)
 マツムラハマキホソガ  — Caloptilia matsumurai Kumata, 1982
 ミヤマハマキホソガ  — Caloptilia monticola Kumata, 1966
 和名未定  — Caloptilia protiella (Deventer, 1904)
 マダラハマキホソガ  — Caloptilia pulverea Kumata, 1966
 和名未定  — Caloptilia pyrrhaspis (Meyrick, 1931)
 ヌルデハマキホソガ  — Caloptilia recitata (Meyrick, 1918)
 ホシヌルデハマキホソガ  — Caloptilia rhois Kumata, 1982
 リュウキュウハマキホソガ  — Caloptilia ryukyuensis Kumata, 1966
 シラキハマキホソガ  — Caloptilia sapiivora Kumata, 1982
 クヌギハマキホソガ  — Caloptilia sapporella (Matsumura, 1931)
 マツブサハマキホソガ  — Caloptilia schisandrae Kumata, 1966
 イチモンジハマキホソガ  — Caloptilia semifasciella Kumata, 1966
 マメハマキホソガ  — Caloptilia soyella (Deventer, 1904)
 ヤナギハマキホソガ  — Caloptilia stigmatella (Fabricius, 1781)
 和名未定  — Caloptilia syrphetias (Meyrick, 1907)
 チャノハマキホソガ  — Caloptilia theivora (Walsingham, 1893)
 ハルニレハマキホソガ  — Caloptilia ulmi Kumata, 1982
 ワカヤマハマキホソガ  — Caloptilia wakayamensis Kumata, 1966
 ヤスダハマキホソガ  — Caloptilia yasudai Kumata, 1982
 リンゴハマキホソガ  — Caloptilia zachrysa (Meyrick, 1937)
 ハスオビハマキホソガ  — Povolnya obliquatella (Matsumura, 1931)
 ナラウススジハマキホソガ  — Povolnya querci (Kumata, 1982)
 タデキボシホソガ  — Calybites phasianipennella (Hübner, [1813])
 和名未定  — Calybites trimaculata Kumata, 1982
 和名未定  — Eucalybites aureola Kumata, 1982
 レイシホソガ  — Conopomorpha litchiella Bradley, 1986
 レイシシロズホソガ  — Conopomorpha sinensis Bradley, 1986
 ホソスジホソガ  — Aristaea bathracma (Meyrick, 1912)
 ギンスジホソガ  — Aristaea issikii Kumata, 1977
 シロスジホソガ  — Aristaea pavoniella (Zeller, 1847)
 クチナシホソガ  — Systoloneura geometropis (Meyrick, 1936)
 カンコマダラホソガ  — Diphtheroptila scriptulata (Meyrick, 1916)
 ウラジロエノキマダラホソガ  — Stomphastis labyrinthica (Meyrick, 1916)
 フジマダラホソガ  — Liocrobyla brachybotrys Kuroko, 1960
 ヌスビトハギマダラホソガ  — Liocrobyla desmodiella Kuroko, 1982
 ハギマダラホソガ  — Liocrobyla kumatai Kuroko, 1982
 クズマダラホソガ  — Liocrobyla lobata Kuroko, 1960
 カキアシブサホソガ  — Cuphodes diospyrosella (Issiki, 1957)
 フジアシブサホソガ  — Cuphodes wisteriella Kuroko, 1982
 和名未定  — Callicercops iridocrossa (Meyrick, 1938)
 和名未定  — Cryptolectica chrysalis Kumata & Ermolaev, 1988
 和名未定  — Cryptolectica ensiformis (Yuan, 1986)
 マテバシイホソガ  — Cryptolectica pasaniae Kumata & Kuroko, 1988
 ヌルデギンホソガ  — Eteoryctis deversa (Meyrick, 1922)
 ニガキギンホソガ  — Eteoryctis picrasmae Kumata & Kuroko, 1988
 フジホソガ  — Psydrocercops wisteriae (Kuroko, 1982)
 和名未定  — Acrocercops albofasciella Yazaki, 1926
 和名未定  — Acrocercops distylii Kumata & Kuroko, 1988
 シイホソガ  — Acrocercops mantica Meyrick, 1908
 シイクロテンホソガ  — Acrocercops melanoplecta Meyrick, 1908
 和名未定  — Acrocercops querci Kumata & Kuroko, 1988
 クルミホソガ  — Acrocercops transecta Meyrick, 1931
 ウスズミホソガ  — Acrocercops unistriata Yuan, 1986
 和名未定  — Acrocercops vallata Kumata & Kuroko, 1988
 和名未定  — Artifodina japonica Kumata, 1985
 和名未定  — Dialectica geometra (Meyrick, 1916)
 和名未定  — Dialectica japonica Kumata & Kuroko, 1988
 アカメガシワホソガ  — Deoptilia heptadeta (Meyrick, 1936)
 ヤブニッケイホソガ  — Gibbovalva civica (Meyrick, 1914)
 コブシホソガ  — Gibbovalva kobusi Kumata & Kuroko, 1988
 ホウノキホソガ  — Gibbovalva magnoliae Kumata & Kuroko, 1988
 クスオビホソガ  — Gibbovalva quadrifasciata (Stainton, 1863)
 ガマホソガ  — Gibbovalva tricuneatella (Meyrick, 1880)
 和名未定  — Gibbovalva urbana (Meyrick, 1908)
 イチジクホソガ  — Melanocercops ficuvorella (Yazaki, 1926)
 和名未定  — Melanocercops phractopa (Meyrick, 1918)
 マメハモグリホソガ  — Phodoryctis caerulea (Meyrick, 1920)
 和名未定  — Phodoryctis stephaniae Kumata & Kuroko, 1988
 ヒサカキホソガ  — Borboryctis euryae Kumata & Kuroko, 1988
 和名未定  — Borboryctis triplaca (Meyrick, 1908)
 ヤマハハコホソガ  — Leucospilapteryx anaphalidis Kumata, 1965
 ヨモギホソガ  — Leucospilapteryx omissella (Stainton, 1848)
 和名未定  — Chrysocercops castanopsidis Kumata & Kuroko, 1988
 カバオビホソガ  — Telamoptilia cathedraea (Meyrick, 1908)
 イノコズチホソガ  — Telamoptilia hemistacta (Meyrick, 1924)
 サツマイモホソガ  — Telamoptilia prosacta (Meyrick, 1918)
 和名未定  — Telamoptilia tiliae Kumata & Ermolaev, 1988
 ナシカワホソガ  — Spulerina astaurota (Meyrick, 1922)
 クリカワホソガ  — Spulerina castaneae Kumata & Kuroko, 1988
 マツノカワホソガ  — Spulerina corticicola Kumata, 1964
 クズホソガ  — Spulerina dissotoma (Meyrick, 1931)
 ツタホソガ  — Spulerina parthenocissi Kumata & Kuroko, 1988
 クヌギカワホソガ  — Spulerina virgulata Kumata & Kuroko, 1988
 ギンモンカワホソガ  — Dendrorycter marmaroides Kumata, 1978
 和名未定  — Ketapangia leucochorda (Meyrick, 1908)
 和名未定  — Ketapangia regulifera (Meyrick, 1933)
 ギンモンツヤホソガ  — Chrysaster hagicola Kumata, 1961
 ミツオビツヤホソガ  — Neolithocolletis hikomonticola Kumata, 1963
 ヌスビトハギツヤホソガ  — Hyloconis desmodii Kumata, 1963
 ハギツヤホソガ  — Hyloconis lespedezae Kumata, 1963
 クズツヤホソガ  — Hyloconis puerariae Kumata, 1963
 フジツヤホソガ  — Hyloconis wisteriae Kumata, 1963
 イタヤニセキンホソガ  — Cameraria acericola Kumata, 1963
 ガマズミニセキンホソガ  — Cameraria hikosanensis Kumata, 1963
 モミジニセキンホソガ  — Cameraria niphonica Kumata, 1963
 ニセクヌギキンモンホソガ  — Phyllonorycter acutissimae (Kumata, 1963)
 アイヌキンモンホソガ  — Phyllonorycter aino (Kumata, 1963)
 フタオビキンモンホソガ  — Phyllonorycter bicinctella (Matsumura, 1931)
 エノキヒメキンモンホソガ  — Phyllonorycter bifurcata (Kumata, 1967)
 和名未定  — Phyllonorycter carpini (Kumata, 1963)
 カバノキンモンホソガ  — Phyllonorycter cavella (Zeller, 1846)
 エノキキンモンホソガ  — Phyllonorycter celtidis (Kumata, 1963)
 ナカオビキンモンホソガ  — Phyllonorycter cretata (Kumata, 1957)
 ダケカンバキンホソガ  — Phyllonorycter dakekanbae (Kumata, 1963)
 ミヤマキンモンホソガ  — Phyllonorycter ermani (Kumata, 1963)
 ブナキンモンホソガ  — Phyllonorycter fagifolia (Kumata, 1963)
 オオキンモンホソガ  — Phyllonorycter gigas (Kumata, 1963)
 カラコギカエデキンモンホソガ  — Phyllonorycter ginnalae (Ermolaev, 1981)
 ハンノキンモンホソガ  — Phyllonorycter hancola (Kumata, 1958)
 ヒコサンキンモンホソガ  — Phyllonorycter hikosana (Kumata, 1963)
 ホソスジキンモンホソガ  — Phyllonorycter issikii (Kumata, 1963)
 ヤマトキンモンホソガ  — Phyllonorycter japonica (Kumata, 1963)
 エゾキンモンホソガ  — Phyllonorycter jezoniella (Matsumura, 1931)
 サンザシキンモンホソガ  — Phyllonorycter jozanae (Kumata, 1967)
 クルミキンモンホソガ  — Phyllonorycter juglandis (Kumata, 1963)
 コケモモキンモンホソガ  — Phyllonorycter junoniella (Zeller, 1846)
 カミジョウキンモンホソガ  — Phyllonorycter kamijoi (Kumata, 1963)
 キソキンモンホソガ  — Phyllonorycter kisoensis Kumata & Park, 1978
 クロコキンモンホソガ  — Phyllonorycter kurokoi (Kumata, 1963)
 オヒョウキンモンホソガ  — Phyllonorycter laciniatae (Kumata, 1967)
 キンスジシロホソガ  — Phyllonorycter leucocorona (Kumata, 1957)
 ツヤオビキンモンホソガ  — Phyllonorycter longispinata (Kumata, 1958)
 スイカズラキンモンホソガ  — Phyllonorycter lonicerae (Kumata, 1963)
 ネジキキンモンホソガ  — Phyllonorycter lyoniae (Kumata, 1963)
 ナカモンキンホソガ  — Phyllonorycter maculata (Kumata, 1963)
 マツダキンモンホソガ  — Phyllonorycter matsudai Kumata, 1986
 ズグロキンモンホソガ  — Phyllonorycter melacoronis (Kumata, 1963)
 ミズナラキンモンホソガ  — Phyllonorycter mongolicae (Kumata, 1963)
 ネジロキンモンホソガ  — Phyllonorycter nigristella (Kumata, 1957)
 クヌギキンモンホソガ  — Phyllonorycter nipponicella (Issiki, 1930)
 カエデキンモンホソガ  — Phyllonorycter orientalis (Kumata, 1963)
 アサダキンモンホソガ  — Phyllonorycter ostryae (Kumata, 1963)
 マダラキンモンホソガ  — Phyllonorycter pastorella (Zeller, 1846)
 カシワミスジキンモンホソガ  — Phyllonorycter persimilis Fujihara, Sato & Kumata, 2000
 ナラキンモンホソガ  — Phyllonorycter pseudolautella (Kumata, 1963)
 サワグルミキンモンホソガ  — Phyllonorycter pterocaryae (Kumata, 1963)
 ナカグロキンモンホソガ  — Phyllonorycter pulchra (Kumata, 1963)
 ヒメキンモンホソガ  — Phyllonorycter pygmaea (Kumata, 1963)
 キンモンホソガ  — Phyllonorycter ringoniella (Matsumura, 1931)
 ハスオビキンモンホソガ  — Phyllonorycter rostrispinosa (Kumata, 1963)
 ヤナギキンモンホソガ  — Phyllonorycter salicicolella (Sircom, 1848)
 ハスオビヤナギキンモンホソガ  — Phyllonorycter salictella (Zeller, 1846)
 ミスジキンモンホソガ  — Phyllonorycter similis Kumata, 1982
 ナナカマドキンモンホソガ  — Phyllonorycter sorbicola (Kumata, 1963)
 フトオビキンモンホソガ  — Phyllonorycter spinolella (Duponchel, 1838)
 コゴメウツギキンモンホソガ  — Phyllonorycter stephanandrae (Kumata, 1967)
 ヤマハンノキキンモンホソガ  — Phyllonorycter strigulatella (Zeller, 1846)
 エゴノキンモンホソガ  — Phyllonorycter styracis (Kumata, 1963)
 タカギキンモンホソガ  — Phyllonorycter takagii (Kumata, 1963)
 ハシバミキンモンホソガ  — Phyllonorycter tenebriosa (Kumata, 1967)
 ミツオビキンモンホソガ  — Phyllonorycter tritorrhecta (Meyrick, 1935)
 ツルギキンモンホソガ  — Phyllonorycter turugisana (Kumata, 1963)
 ウチダキンモンホソガ  — Phyllonorycter uchidai (Kumata, 1963)
 ニレキンモンホソガ  — Phyllonorycter ulmi (Kumata, 1963)
 ツマスジキンモンホソガ  — Phyllonorycter ulmiforiella (Hübner, [1817])
 ガマズミキンモンホソガ  — Phyllonorycter viburni (Kumata, 1963)
 クサフジキンモンホソガ  — Phyllonorycter viciae (Kumata, 1963)
 ワタナベキンモンホソガ  — Phyllonorycter watanabei (Kumata, 1963)
 ヤクシマキンモンホソガ  — Phyllonorycter yakusimensis (Kumata, 1967)
 ケヤキキンモンホソガ  — Phyllonorycter zelkovae (Kumata, 1963)
 チビキンモンホソガ  — Porphyrosela alternata Kumata, 1993
 和名未定  — Porphyrosela dorinda (Meyrick, 1912)
 Eumetriochroa araliella Kobayashi, Huang & Hirowatari, 2013
 キヅタオビギンホソガ  — Eumetriochroa hederae Kumata, 1998
 和名未定  — Eumetriochroa hiranoi Kumata, 1998
 和名未定  — Eumetriochroa kalopanacis Kumata, 1998
 イヌツゲオビギンホソガ  — Eumetriochroa miyatai Kumata, 1998
 ネズミモチクロホソガ  — Metriochroa fraxinella Kumata, 1998
 和名未定  — Metriochroa syringae Kumata, 1998
 和名未定  — Corythoxestis sunosei (Kumata, 1998)
 Corythoxestis tricalysiella Kobayashi, Huang & Hirowatari, 2013
 和名未定  — Corythoxestis yaeyamensis (Kumata, 1998)
 Guttigera schefflerella Kobayashi, Huang & Hirowatari, 2013
 ミカンコハモグリ  — Phyllocnistis citrella Stainton, 1856
 和名未定  — Phyllocnistis cornella Ermolaev, 1987
 ユズリハコハモグリ  — Phyllocnistis hyperbolacma (Meyrick, 1931)
 ヤナギコハモグリ  — Phyllocnistis saligna (Zeller, 1839)
 センダンコハモグリ  — Phyllocnistis selenopa Meyrick, 1915
 ブドウコハモグリ  — Phyllocnistis toparcha Meyrick, 1918
 和名未定  — Phyllocnistis unipunctella (Stephens, 1834)

Yponomeutidae
 アセビツバメスガ  — Saridoscelis kodamai Moriuti, 1961
 シャシャンボツバメスガ  — Saridoscelis sphenias Meyrick, 1894
 シロツバメスガ  — Saridoscelis synodias Meyrick, 1932
 マルギンバネスガ  — Thecobathra anas (Stringer, 1930)
 トガリギンバネスガ  — Thecobathra eta (Moriuti, 1963)
 ツヤギンバネスガ  — Niphonympha vera Moriuti, 1963
 オオボシハイスガ  — Yponomeuta anatolicus Stringer, 1930
 モトキスガ  — Yponomeuta bipunctellus Matsumura, 1931
 ツリバナスガ  — Yponomeuta eurinellus Zagulajev, 1969
 ヒメボシハイスガ  — Yponomeuta griseatus Moriuti, 1977
 ニシキギスガ  — Yponomeuta kanaiellus Matsumura, 1931
 和名未定  — Yponomeuta kostjuki Gershenson, 1985
 ツルマサキスガ  — Yponomeuta mayumivorellus Matsumura, 1931
 マサキスガ  — Yponomeuta meguronis Matsumura, 1931
 和名未定  — Yponomeuta menkeni Gershenson & Ulenberg, 1998
 ヤマハイスガ  — Yponomeuta montanatus Moriuti, 1977
 リンゴスガ  — Yponomeuta orientalis Zagulajev, 1969
 マユミハイスガ  — Yponomeuta osakae Moriuti, 1977
 オオボシオオスガ  — Yponomeuta polystictus Butler, 1879
 コマユミシロスガ  — Yponomeuta polystigmellus Felder & Felder, 1862
 サクラスガ  — Yponomeuta refrigerata Meyrick, 1931
 ベンケイソウスガ  — Yponomeuta sedella (Treitschke, 1833)
 ツルウメモドキスガ  — Yponomeuta sociatus Moriuti, 1972
 マユミシロスガ  — Yponomeuta spodocrossus Meyrick, 1935
 マユミオオスガ  — Yponomeuta tokyonellus Matsumura, 1931
 ツマグロハイスガ  — Yponomeuta yanagawanus Matsumura, 1931
 ヒメニセハイスガ  — Eumonopyta unicornis Moriuti, 1977
 ムモンニセハイスガ  — Euhyponomeuta secundus Moriuti, 1977
 ホシニセハイスガ  — Teinoptila guttella Moriuti, 1977
 ハイズソバカススガ  — Kessleria insulella Moriuti, 1977
 シロズキヌスガ  — Kessleria pseudosericella Moriuti, 1977
 ヒメホソスガ  — Euhyponomeutoides namikoae Moriuti, 1977
 ホソスガ  — Euhyponomeutoides trachydeltus (Meyrick, 1931)
 イボタコスガ  — Zelleria hepariella Stainton, 1849
 ニセイボタコスガ  — Zelleria japonicella Moriuti, 1977
 ハシドイコスガ  — Zelleria silvicolella Moriuti, 1977
 ホソバコスガ  — Xyrosaris lichneuta Meyrick, 1918
 アトジロコスガ  — Lycophantis bradleyi Moriuti, 1963
 オオシロジスガ  — Klausius major Moriuti, 1977
 ヒメシロジスガ  — Klausius minor Moriuti, 1977
 キエリヒメスガ  — Lampresthia lucella Moriuti, 1977
 アトスカシモンヒメスガ  — Metanomeuta fulvicrinis Meyrick, 1935
 ニセウスグロヒメスガ  — Swammerdamia caesiella (Hübner, [1796])
 ウスグロヒメスガ  — Swammerdamia pyrella (Villers, 1789)
 マンネングサヒメスガ  — Swammerdamia sedella Moriuti, 1977
 ミヤマヒメスガ  — Paraswammerdamia monticolella Moriuti, 1977
 ウスキヒメスガ  — Cedestis exiguata Moriuti, 1977
 アカマツハモグリスガ  — Ocnerostoma friesei Svensson, 1966
 クルミニセスガ  — Prays alpha Moriuti, 1977
 トネリコニセスガ  — Prays beta Moriuti, 1977
 ミヤマイボタニセスガ  — Prays delta Moriuti, 1977
 ハイイロニセスガ  — Prays epsilon Moriuti, 1977
 ツヤズニセスガ  — Prays gamma Moriuti, 1977
 ミヤマガマズミニセスガ  — Prays iota Moriuti, 1977
 ムモンニセスガ  — Prays kappa Moriuti, 1977
 サンゴジュニセスガ  — Prays lambda Moriuti, 1977
 ガマズミニセスガ  — Prays omicron Moriuti, 1977
 シロズメムシガ  — Argyresthia albicomella Moriuti, 1969
 ナナカマドメムシガ  — Argyresthia alpha Friese & Moriuti, 1968
 カタキンメムシガ  — Argyresthia angusta Moriuti, 1969
 スギメムシガ  — Argyresthia anthocephala Meyrick, 1936
 セジロメムシガ  — Argyresthia assimilis Moriuti, 1977
 モチツツジメムシガ  — Argyresthia beta Friese & Moriuti, 1968
 シロモンキンメムシガ  — Argyresthia brockeella (Hübner, [1813])
 ヒノキハモグリガ  — Argyresthia chamaecypariae Moriuti, 1965
 クロモンメムシガ  — Argyresthia communana Moriuti, 1969
 リンゴヒメシンクイ  — Argyresthia conjugella Zeller, 1839
 カオキメムシガ  — Argyresthia festiva Moriuti, 1969
 シンチュウムモンメムシガ  — Argyresthia flavicomans Moriuti, 1969
 ハイイロムモンメムシガ  — Argyresthia fujiyamae Moriuti, 1969
 ズミメムシガ  — Argyresthia ivella (Haworth, 1828)
 カラマツエダモグリガ  — Argyresthia laevigatella Herrich-Schäffer, 1855
 アトモンメムシガ  — Argyresthia magna Moriuti, 1969
 オオムジメムシガ  — Argyresthia metallicolor Moriuti, 1969
 トドマツメムシガ  — Argyresthia nemorivaga Moriuti, 1969
 シロオビキンメムシガ  — Argyresthia perbella Moriuti, 1969
 ネズミサシミモグリガ  — Argyresthia praecocella Zeller, 1839
 アトジロメムシガ  — Argyresthia rara Moriuti, 1969
 アミメシロメムシガ  — Argyresthia retinella Zeller, 1839
 ビャクシンハモグリガ  — Argyresthia sabinae Moriuti, 1965
 オオキメムシガ  — Argyresthia subrimosa Meyrick, 1932
 ツツジメムシガ  — Argyresthia tutuzicolella Moriuti, 1969
 ニホンニセメムシガ  — Paraargyresthia japonica Moriuti, 1969

Ypsolophidae
 スイカズラクチブサガ  — Bhadorcosma lonicerae Moriuti, 1977
 ホソトガリクチブサガ  — Ypsolopha acuminatus (Butler, 1878)
 ギンスジクチブサガ  — Ypsolopha albistriatus (Issiki, 1930)
 メノコクチブサガ  — Ypsolopha amoenellus (Christoph, 1882)
 キンツヤクチブサガ  — Ypsolopha auratus Moriuti, 1977
 オオキクチブサガ  — Ypsolopha blandellus (Christoph, 1882)
 ノコヒゲクチブサガ  — Ypsolopha cristatus Moriuti, 1977
 ミダレモンクチブサガ  — Ypsolopha distinctatus Moriuti, 1977
 キイロクチブサガ  — Ypsolopha flavus (Issiki, 1930)
 サビイロクチブサガ  — Ypsolopha fujimotoi Moriuti, 1964
 オオアトベリクチブサガ  — Ypsolopha japonicus Moriuti, 1964
 シロムネクチブサガ  — Ypsolopha leuconotellus (Snellen, 1884)
 マユミオオクチブサガ  — Ypsolopha longus Moriuti, 1964
 コナラクチブサガ  — Ypsolopha parallelus (Caradja, 1939)
 ウスイロクチブサガ  — Ypsolopha parenthesellus (Linnaeus, 1761)
 マエシロクチブサガ  — Ypsolopha saitoi Moriuti, 1964
 和名未定  — Ypsolopha sasayamanus (Matsumura, 1931)
 シロスジクチブサガ  — Ypsolopha strigosus (Butler, 1879)
 コメツガクチブサガ  — Ypsolopha tsugae Moriuti, 1977
 アトベリクチブサガ  — Ypsolopha vittellus (Linnaeus, 1758)
 クロテンキクチブサガ  — Ypsolopha yasudai Moriuti, 1964
 ムラサキクチブサガ  — Rhabdocosma aglaophanes Meyrick, 1935

Plutellidae
 ダイセツナガ  — Plutella porrectella (Linnaeus, 1758)
 コナガ  — Plutella xylostella (Linnaeus, 1758)
 ヒロバコナガ  — Leuroperna sera (Meyrick, 1889)
 アトモンナガ  — Rhigognostis japonica (Moriuti, 1977)
 ナガバナガ  — Rhigognostis senilella (Zetterstedt, 1840)
 シロオビクロナガ  — Eidophasia albifasciata Issiki, 1930

Acrolepiidae
 ヨモギハモグリコガ  — Digitivalva artemisiella Moriuti, 1972
 チビカザリコガ  — Digitivalva hemiglypha Diakonoff & Arita, 1976
 和名未定  — Digitivalva sibirica Toll, 1958
 アトシロモンコガ  — Digitivalvopsis paradoxa (Moriuti, 1982)
 キマダラコガ  — Acrolepiopsis clavivalvatella Moriuti, 1972
 ミズギボウシアトモンコガ  — Acrolepiopsis delta (Moriuti, 1961)
 トコロミコガ  — Acrolepiopsis issikiella (Moriuti, 1961)
 ヤマノイモムカゴコガ  — Acrolepiopsis japonica Gaedike, 1982
 ナガイモコガ  — Acrolepiopsis nagaimo Yasuda, 2000
 ウチョウランハモグリコガ  — Acrolepiopsis orchidophaga Moriuti, 1982
 イノコズチコガ  — Acrolepiopsis persimilis Moriuti, 1974
 和名未定  — Acrolepiopsis peterseni Gaedike
 ギボウシアトモンコガ  — Acrolepiopsis postomacula (Matsumura, 1931)
 ネギコガ  — Acrolepiopsis sapporensis (Matsumura, 1931)
 ヤマノイモコガ  — Acrolepiopsis suzukiella (Matsumura, 1931)

Glyphipterigidae
 コホソハマキモドキ  — Glyphipterix alpha Moriuti & Saito, 1964
 シロオビホソハマキモドキ  — Glyphipterix basifasciata Issiki, 1930
 オオホソハマキモドキ  — Glyphipterix beta Moriuti & Saito, 1964
 シロモンホソハマキモドキ  — Glyphipterix delta Moriuti & Saito, 1964
 和名未定  — Glyphipterix ditiorana (Walker, 1863)
 アトフタモンホソハマキモドキ  — Glyphipterix euleucotoma Diakonoff & Arita, 1976
 シロズホソハマキモドキ  — Glyphipterix forsterella nivicaput Arita, 1987
 ヒメシロスジホソハマキモドキ  — Glyphipterix funditrix Diakonoff & Arita, 1976
 カラカネホソハマキモドキ  — Glyphipterix gamma Moriuti & Saito, 1964
 キスジホソハマキモドキ  — Glyphipterix gaudialis Diakonoff & Arita, 1976
 ヒメキスジホソハマキモドキ  — Glyphipterix gemmula Diakonoff & Arita, 1976
 メスモンホソハマキモドキ  — Glyphipterix imparfasciata Arita, 1979
 キモンホソハマキモドキ  — Glyphipterix japonicella Zeller, 1877
 キオビホソハマキモドキ  — Glyphipterix luteomaculata Arita, 1979
 メラニアホソハマキモドキ  — Glyphipterix melania Diakonoff & Arita, 1976
 トウキョウホソハマキモドキ  — Glyphipterix mikadonis Arita & Owada, 2006
 ヘリグロホソハマキモドキ  — Glyphipterix nigromarginata Issiki, 1930
 ホソモンホソハマキモドキ  — Glyphipterix okui Diakonoff & Arita, 1976
 アトミスジホソハマキモドキ  — Glyphipterix regula Diakonoff & Arita, 1976
 和名未定  — Glyphipterix scleriae Arita, 1987
 ナミホソハマキモドキ  — Glyphipterix semiflavana Issiki, 1930
 ヒロモンホソハマキモドキ  — Glyphipterix trigonodes Arita, 1979
 ツマキホソハマキモドキ  — Lepidotarphius perornatellus (Walker, 1864)
 ツヤホソハマキモドキ  — Carmentina molybdotoma (Diakonoff & Arita, 1979)

Heliodinidae
 クロマイコガ  — Corsocasis coronias Meyrick, 1912
 ハリギリマイコガ  — Epicroesa chromatorhoea Diakonoff & Arita, 1979

Bedelliidae
 ノアサガオハモグリガ  — Bedellia ipomoella Kuroko, 1982
 ヒルガオハモグリガ  — Bedellia somnulentella (Zeller, 1847)

Lyonetiidae
 シャリンバイハモグリガ  — Lyonetia anthemopa Meyrick, 1936
 バクチノキハモグリガ  — Lyonetia bakuchia Kuroko, 1964
 カラムシハモグリガ  — Lyonetia boehmeriella Kuroko, 1964
 クリハモグリガ  — Lyonetia castaneella Kuroko, 1964
 モモハモグリガ  — Lyonetia clerkella (Linnaeus, 1758)
 ヒサカキハモグリガ  — Lyonetia euryella Kuroko, 1964
 ツツジハモグリガ  — Lyonetia ledi Wocke, 1859
 ハマヒサカキハモグリガ  — Lyonetia meridiana Kuroko, 1982
 ヤマモモハモグリガ  — Lyonetia myricella Kuroko, 1964
 リンゴハモグリガ  — Lyonetia prunifoliella malinella (Matsumura, 1910)
 ヤスダハモグリガ  — Lyonetia yasudai Kuroko, 1964
 ダイズギンモンハモグリ  — Microthauma glycinella Kuroko, 1964
 ヤマハギシロハモグリ  — Microthauma lespedezella Seksjaeva, 1990
 ツルウメモドキシロハモグリ  — Proleucoptera celastrella Kuroko, 1964
 ツリバナシロハモグリ  — Proleucoptera oxyphyllella Kuroko, 1964
 サルトリイバラシロハモグリ  — Proleucoptera smilactis Kuroko, 1964
 ポプラシロハモグリ  — Paraleucoptera sinuella (Reutti, 1853)
 カラコギカエデシロハモグリ  — Leucoptera ermolaevi Seksjaeva, 1990
 クズシロハモグリ  — Leucoptera puerariella Kuroko, 1964

M